Rear admiral (RAdm) is a flag officer rank of the British Royal Navy.  It is immediately superior to commodore and is subordinate to vice admiral. It is a two-star rank and has a NATO ranking code of OF-7.

The rank originated in the days of naval sailing squadrons and each naval squadron would be assigned an admiral as its head.  He would command from the centre vessel and direct the activities of the squadron.  The admiral would in turn be assisted by a vice admiral, who commanded the lead ships which would bear the brunt of a naval battle.  In the rear of the naval squadron, a third admiral would command the remaining ships and, as this section of the squadron was considered to be in the least danger, the admiral in command of the rear would typically be the most junior of the squadron admirals. This has survived into the modern age, with the rank of rear admiral the most-junior of the admiralty ranks of many navies.

List of Royal Navy rear admirals

 Sir Alexander Dundas Young Arbuthnott
 Sir Robert Arbuthnot, 4th Baronet
 Nicholas Ingram (1754-1826)
 Peter John Douglas (1787–1858)
 Sir Frederick Lewis Maitland, KCB

List of Rear Admirals

See also
 List of senior officers of the Royal Navy
 List of British Army full generals
 List of Royal Navy admirals
 List of Royal Navy vice admirals

References

 
Rear admirals
Lists of admirals